R Coronae Australis (R CrA) is a variable binary system in the constellation Corona Australis. It has varied between magnitudes 10 and 14.36. A small reflection/emission nebula NGC 6729 extends from the star towards SE. It is also the brightest feature of the Coronet Cluster, therefore sometimes called R CrA Cluster.

It was previously believed that in roughly 222,000 years, this system could have approached within  of the Sun. However, the estimate had a considerable margin of error in it. With the release of Gaia DR2, the star was determined to be 4 times further from the Sun than initially believed, constraining the approach to only .

A companion to the star was proposed in 2019 with a mass between 0.1 and 1 Solar masses, depending on the characteristics of the stellar environment, orbiting the primary in 43–47 years. It has also been proposed that the primary component is itself a close binary.

References

A-type giants
Corona Australis
Coronae Australis, R
093449
Durchmusterung objects
Herbig Ae/Be stars